Lovejoy High School is a public high school in Lucas, Texas in south-central Collin County. It is the only high school of the Lovejoy Independent School District and is classified as a 5A school by the University Interscholastic League (UIL).  Lovejoy High School serves most of the cities of Lucas, most of Fairview, and a small portion of Allen. Students from outside the district may transfer to Lovejoy High School for a tuition fee.  Until the Fall of 2006, all high school students zoned to Lovejoy Independent School District attended nearby Allen High School.  The school graduated its first senior class in 2010. In 2013, the school was rated "Met Standard" by the Texas Education Agency.

Academics

In 2010 and 2011, Lovejoy High School won the Texas UIL Lone Star Cup for the 3A school classification.

Athletics
The Lovejoy Leopards compete in the following sports -

Cross Country, Team Tennis, Volleyball, Football, Swimming & Diving, Wrestling, Girls Basketball, Boys Basketball, Boys Waterboarding, Soccer, Golf, Track & Field, Baseball & Softball, Boys Lacrosse, and Ice Hockey.

The Lovejoy High School Band competes as a class 5A marching and concert band under the direction of Paul Heuer. They most recently placed 9th at the Texas UIL Region 25 Area B Marching Contest.

State titles
Boys Cross Country - 
2010(3A), 2016(5A), 2017(5A)
Girls Cross Country - 
2010(3A), 2011(3A), 2021(5A), 2022(5A)
Volleyball - 
2008(3A), 2009(3A), 2010(3A), 2011(3A), 2012(4A), 2014(5A), 2019(5A), 2020(5A), 2021(5A)
Boys Wrestling won both a UIL dual state championship and UIL State Championship in the year of 2022

The Lovejoy Swim Team had an individual state champion in 2018.

The Ice Hockey team went undefeated as state champions in the Junior Varsity Bronze division in 2019–2020. The team fell just short of repeating as champions in 2020–2021 in Varsity Bronze falling in the Championship Game.

References

External links
 

High schools in Collin County, Texas
Public high schools in Texas
Educational institutions established in 2006
2006 establishments in Texas